Sunamganj is a district located in north-eastern Bangladesh within the Sylhet Division.

History
In the ancient period, Sunamganj was part of the Laur Kingdom. After the conquest of Sylhet (Kingdom of Gauiurh) in 1303 by Muslims under the spiritual guidance of Shah Jalal, Shah Kamal Quhafah established a capital in Shaharpara with the aid of his twelve disciples and his second son, Shah Muazzamuddin Qureshi, who also maintained a second sub-administration office at Nizgaon on the bank of the river Surma, present day Shologhar (there is now Shologhar Masjid and madrasa) in Sunamganj town, which was administered by one of his descendants. Between the latter part of 1300 CE and 1765 CE, the present-day Sunamganj district was a part of Iqlim-e-Muazzamabad, i.e. the state of Muazzamabad, which was an independent state until 1620 when it was conquered by the mighty Mughal of Delhi. The last sultan of Muazzamabad was Hamid Qureshi Khan, who was a descendant of Shah Kamal Quhafah and he was widely known by his appellation of Shamsher Khan. After the fall of Jalalabad (present-day Sylhet), Shamsher Khan, accepted the post of Nawab-cum-Fauzadar and remained so until his death at the Battle of Giria on 29 April 1740 along with Sarfaraz Khan, Nawab of Bengal.

Administration

District
District Administrator is appointed from amongst non-civil servants, usually from amongst the member of political party that is in power at the time of appointment and endorsed by the central government. Deputy Commissioner is appointed from amongst career civil servants, who administers all subordinate branches of the administration such as upazillah parishad Mr.Black was the first district commissioner of Sunamganj.

Subdistricts
Sunamganj District comprises 12 sub-districts or upazilas:
 Bishwamvarpur
 Chhatak
 Shantiganj
 Derai
 Dharamapasha
 Dowarabazar
 Jagannathpur
 Jamalganj
 Sullah
 Sunamganj Sadar
 Tahirpur
 Madhyanagar

During the late British colonial period, Sunamganj was a subdivision and contained six thanas; Sunamganj Sadar, Tahirpur, Chhatak (inc. Duarabazar), Derai, Jagannathpur and Dharmapasa.

Demographics 

According to the 2022 Bangladesh census, Sunamganj District had a population of 2,695,495 of which 1,322,590 were males, 1,371,517 were females and 223 were third genders. Rural population was 2,292,364 (85.0%) while the urban population was 401,966 (15.0%). Sunamganj district had a literacy rate of 64.77% for the population 7 years and above: 66.0% for males and 63.61% for females.

Muslims make up 88.16% of the population, while Hindus are 11.67% of the population.

Education

University

Sunamganj Science and Technology University
Sunamganj Agricultural University

Medical College

Bangabandhu Medical College

Healthcare

The district has 12 government hospitals and 22 health centers. The infant mortality rate is 62 per 1000 child births. The average lifespan of the district's residents is 62 years.

Notable people
 A. Zahur Miah, Member of Parliament, politician
Abdur Raees (1931-1988), former Member of Parliament in Pakistan and Bangladesh
Abdus Samad Azad (1922-2005), former Minister of Foreign Affairs
Anwar Choudhury (born 1959), former Governor of the Cayman Islands and High Commissioner of the UK to Bangladesh
Apsana Begum (born 1990), Member of the British Parliament for Poplar and Limehouse
Asaddor Ali (1929-2005), writer, researcher and historian
Ayub Ali Master (1880-1980), social reformer in Britain
 Dewan Mohammad Azraf, educator, philosopher and National Professor of Bangladesh
 Hassan Shahriar, journalist and political analyst
 Kakon Bibi, freedom fighter, Bir Protik
Luthfur Rahman (born 1976), deputy leader of Manchester, England
Shah Abdul Majid Qureshi (1915-2003), social reformer in Britain
Shah Kamal Quhafah (1291-1385), Arab religious figure
 Shahed Ali, author and novelist
Syeda Shahar Banu (1914-1983), language activist
 Manik Lal Ray, communist politician , Teacher pioneer of mass-education , freedom fighter 
 Ramkanai Das, classical and folk musician
 Shushama Das, folk musician
 Suhasini Das, social worker and activist
 Radharaman Dutta, musician and mystic poet
 Shah Abdul Karim, musician and songwriter
 Hason Raja, musician and mystic poet
 Alaur Rahman, vocalist and music composer

Notes

References

 
Districts of Bangladesh